The Kisumu–Kakamega–Webuye–Kitale Road, is a rural road in Kenya. The road links Kisumu, in Kisumu County, to the towns of Kakamega, in Kakamega County, Webuye in Bungoma County, and Kitale in Trans-Nzoia County.

Location
The road starts at Kisumu, on the northeastern shores of Lake Victoria. The coordinates of the road, south of Kakamega are:0°15'08.0"N, 34°45'01.0"E (Latitude:0°15'08.0"N; Longitude:34°45'01.0"E).

Overview
This road is part of an important road corridor that links the four counties that it passes through, to markets in Uganda and South Sudan. The od also connects to Tanzania via the Isebania–Kisii–Ahero Road. The road is divided into three sections, namely (a) Kisumu–Kakamega (b) Kakamega–Webuye and (c) Webuye–Kitale. The road is designated as a Class A road, and is under the jurisdiction of Kenya National Highway Authority.

Upgrading and widening
Beginning in 2015, the Government of Kenya, through its parastatal KeNHA began to widen the road to 11 meters (36 feet), with shoulders, culverts, drainage channels, passing lanes, bus stops and access roads in urban centres. In some sections the road will be widened to dual carriage. The entire project is budgeted at KSh4.7 billion (approximately US$46.7 million). Work is expected to be complete in early 2017.   *Note: US$1.00 = KSh100.80 on 4 April 2016

See also
 List of roads in Kenya
 East African Community

References

External links
Website of Kenya National Highway Authority

Roads in Kenya
Geography of Kenya
Transport in Kenya
Trans-Nzoia County
Bungoma County
Kakamega County
Vihiga County
Kisumu County